KARJ (92.1 MHz) is an FM radio station serving the North County of San Diego County, California, United States, airing a Worship music format from the Air1 network, and is owned by the Educational Media Foundation.

The station broadcasts with 580 watts of effective radiated power (ERP).

History

Country 1978- 199?) 
This station began program testing in 1966, However, it didn't sign on until August 1978, when it became KOWN-FM. It broadcast a country music format known as "The Cow." In 1987, it became KWNQ, later becoming KOWF-FM, At this point, the station broadcast country music from local studios in Escondido.

Classical (199?-2001) 
The callsign was changed KFSD while owned by the Astor Broadcast Group, who chose a format of classical music acquired from Lotus Communications in 1997.

Alternative (2001-2003) 
In 2001 switched to an alternative rock format as Premium 92/1, still with the KFSD call letters. Station management admitted that the classical format has been in the red for years and the change was made to increase revenue.

Country (2003-2017) 
In 2003, KFSD-FM was purchased by Jefferson Pilot Communications and turned into KSOQ-FM, the simulcasting partner for their popular country music station KSON-FM, which faced geographical challenges to its signal's penetration into the North County area of San Diego County as well as into southern Riverside County, problems largely solved by the addition of KSOQ. Fans of the alternative format were directed to listen to Lincoln's KBZT.

On December 8, 2014, Entercom announced that it will purchase Lincoln Financial Group's entire 15-station lineup (including KSOQ) in a $106.5 million deal, and would operate the outlets under a LMA deal until the sale was approved by the FCC. The sale was consummated on July 17, 2015.

Contemporary Christian (2017-2019) 
On September 26, 2017, Entercom announced a divestment of three stations (KSOQ, WGGI, and KSWD) to the Educational Media Foundation as part of its merger with CBS Radio (which locally owned KEGY and KYXY) to comply with FCC ownership rules in the San Diego market; the FCC approved the sale of all three stations on November 2. Upon the closing of the acquisition on November 16, EMF flipped the station to its then Contemporary Christian Air 1 network at 1:00pm that day, at exactly the same time as KSWD's switch to CCM programming. EMF also changed the station's call letters to KYDQ, the callsign is similar to repeater station KYDO.

Worship (2019-present) 
The station adopted its current format at midnight on January 1, 2019 when the whole Air 1 network shifted to worship music.  On April 11, 2019, this station changed its callsign to KARJ, the new callsign resembles "Air1". This is the second time EMF had changed the callsign, the first being when EMF took control in 2017.

HD Programming
Under its previous owner, an HD Radio transmitter was fitted to the station. The HD1 channel is the digitized standard signal as required by law. The current HD channels are listed below
HD2: K-Love Classics
HD3: Radio Nueva Vida simulcast

References

External links

FCC History Cards for KARJ

ARJ
Air1 radio stations
Escondido, California
Educational Media Foundation radio stations
Radio stations established in 1966
1966 establishments in California
ARJ